Joseph Walker McCorkle (June 24, 1819 – March 18, 1884) was an American lawyer and politician who served one term as a California congressman from 1851 to 1853.

Early life
McCorkle was born in Piqua, Ohio on June 24, 1819. He attended Kenyon College as a member of the class of 1839, but left before graduating. He studied law and was admitted to the bar in 1842. He moved to Dayton, Ohio, where he established a law practice. From 1845 to 1849, McCorkle also served as Dayton's postmaster.

In 1849, McCorkle moved to San Francisco, California at the start of the gold rush. In 1850, he was an unsuccessful candidate for judge of California's Eighth Judicial District.

Continued career
Later in 1850, McCorkle obtained the Democratic nomination for the California State Assembly. He won the general election and served one term, 1850 to 1852. In 1850, he was the Democratic nominee for Congress from California's 2nd District. He was elected and served one term, 1851 to 1853. He was an unsuccessful candidate for reelection in 1852.

On June 1, 1853, a dispute with he fought a duel with William M. Gwin, a fellow Democrat and one of California's U.S. Senators, over the management of federal patronage. Gwin and McCorkle fired rifles at each other in San Mateo, California and came away unharmed. A donkey in a field several hundred yards away was accidentally struck and died.

Later life
After leaving Congress, McCorkle moved from San Francisco to Marysville, California where he returned to practicing law. In 1853, he was appointed judge of the 9th Judicial District, and he served until 1857. In 1855, he was an unsuccessful candidate for U.S. Senator.

In 1857, McCorkle returned to San Francisco where he resumed practicing law. In 1860, just after the 1859 discovery of the Comstock Lode, he moved to nearby Virginia City, Nevada, where he practiced law until 1870. He left Virginia City to practice law in Washington, D.C., where he specialized in cases before the American-Mexican Claims Commission.

Death and burial
In retirement, McCorkle resided in Branchville, College Park, Maryland. He died in Branchville on March 18, 1884. McCorkle was buried at Forest Hill Cemetery in Piqua, Ohio. He was a lifelong bachelor and had no children.

References

External links

1819 births
1884 deaths
Democratic Party members of the United States House of Representatives from California
19th-century American politicians